The 2018 Orléans Masters was a badminton tournament which took place at Palais des Sports in France from 27 March to 1 April 2018 and had a total purse of $75,000.

Tournament
The 2018 Orléans Masters was the first Super 100 tournament of the 2018 BWF World Tour and also part of the Orléans Masters championships which had been held since 2012. This tournament was organized by the Cercle Laïque des Tourelles Orléans Badminton (CLTO) with the sanction from the French Badminton Federation (FFBaD) and BWF. It was also the first ever new Super 100 Level 6 tournament of the BWF World Tour schedule.

Venue
This international tournament was held at Palais des Sports in Orléans, Centre-Val de Loire, France.

Point distribution
Below is the point distribution for each phase of the tournament based on the BWF points system for the BWF Tour Super 100 event.

Prize money
The total prize money for this tournament was US$75,000. Distribution of prize money was in accordance with BWF regulations.

Men's singles

Seeds

 Sameer Verma (semi-finals)
 Ygor Coelho de Oliveira (second round)
 Rasmus Gemke (final)
 Mark Caljouw (champion)
 Parupalli Kashyap (quarter-finals)
 Pablo Abián (second round)
 Emil Holst (third round)
 Lucas Corvée (quarter-finals)

Finals

Top half

Section 1

Section 2

Bottom half

Section 3

Section 4

Women's singles

Seeds

 Beatriz Corrales (first round)
 Mia Blichfeldt (final)
 Natalia Koch Rohde (withdrew)
 Linda Zechiri (second round)
 Lee Ying Ying (second round)
 Mette Poulsen (first round)
 Neslihan Yiğit (quarter-finals)
 Gregoria Mariska Tunjung (quarter-finals)

Finals

Top half

Section 1

Section 2

Bottom half

Section 3

Section 4

Men's doubles

Seeds

 Manu Attri / B. Sumeeth Reddy (first round)
 Jones Ralfy Jansen / Josche Zurwonne (first round)
 Mark Lamsfuß / Marvin Emil Seidel (champions)
 Jacco Arends / Ruben Jille (second round)
 Jelle Maas / Robin Tabeling (second round)
 Alwin Francis / Nandagopal Kidambi (quarter-finals)
 Evgenij Dremin / Denis Grachev (second round)
 Kasper Antonsen / Niclas Nøhr (semi-finals)

Finals

Top half

Section 1

Section 2

Bottom half

Section 3

Section 4

Women's doubles

Seeds

 Gabriela Stoeva / Stefani Stoeva (champions)
 Anastasia Chervyakova / Olga Morozova (first round)
 Isabel Herttrich / Carla Nelte (withdrew)
 Maiken Fruergaard / Sara Thygesen (withdrew)

Finals

Top half

Section 1

Section 2

Bottom half

Section 3

Section 4

Mixed doubles

Seeds

 Mark Lamsfuß / Isabel Herttrich (first round)
 Ronan Labar / Audrey Fontaine (quarter-finals)
 Marvin Emil Seidel / Linda Efler (quarter-finals)
 Jacco Arends / Selena Piek (quarter-finals)
 Sam Magee / Chloe Magee (second round)
 Evgenij Dremin / Evgenia Dimova (semi-finals)
 Mikkel Mikkelsen / Mai Surrow (first round)
 Robin Tabeling / Cheryl Seinen (second round)

Finals

Top half

Section 1

Section 2

Bottom half

Section 3

Section 4

References

External links
 Tournament Link

Orléans Masters
Orleans Masters
Orleans Masters
Orleans Masters
Orleans Masters